Wallace Fard, also known as Wallace Fard Muhammad or Master Fard Muhammad (reportedly born February 26,  – disappeared ), was the founder of the Nation of Islam. He arrived in Detroit in 1930 with an ambiguous background and several aliases, and taught an idiosyncratic form of what he considered Islam to members of the city's black population. In 1934, he disappeared from public record, and Elijah Muhammad succeeded him as leader of the Nation of Islam.

Influence 
Fard Muhammad, acting as a door-to-door travelling salesman, spread his religious teachings throughout Detroit, and within three years grew the movement to a reported 8,000–9,000 members in Detroit, Chicago, and other cities. In 2007, the Nation of Islam had an estimated membership of 20,000–50,000.

The annual Saviour's Day event is held in honor of Master Fard's birth. In 2020, it attracted an estimated 14,000 participants.

Fard taught a form of black exceptionalism and self-pride to poor Southern blacks during the Great Northward Migration at a time when old ideas of scientific racism were prevalent. He advocated community members to establish and own their own businesses, eat healthy, raise families, and refrain from drugs and alcohol. He influenced his successor Elijah Muhammad, Malcolm X and many other Black Nationalist thinkers.  Both during and after his life, some charged that Fard was a con man who used mystery and charisma to swindle poor blacks by selling them new Muslim names and stirring up racial animosity by copying selected elements of other Muslim religious sects and ideologies that would fit his racial supremacist narrative.

Beynon's account of Fard and his followers
In 1938, sociologist Erdmann Doane Beynon published in the American Journal of Sociology a firsthand account of several interviews he conducted with followers of Fard in Michigan. From those interviews, Beynon wrote that Fard lived and taught in Detroit from 1930 to 1934. He came to the homes of black families who had recently migrated to Detroit from the rural South. He began by selling silks door to door, telling his listeners that the silks came from their ancestral homeland. At his suggestion, he came back to teach the residents, along with guests.

In the early stage of his ministry, Fard "used the Bible as his textbook, since it was the only religious book with which the majority of his hearers were familiar. With growing prestige over a constantly increasing group, [Fard] became bolder in his denunciation of white people and began to attack the teachings of the Bible in such a way as to shock his hearers and bring them to an emotional crisis."

Beynon's interviewees told him that reports of Fard's message spread throughout the black community. Attendance at the house meetings grew until the listeners were divided into groups and taught in shifts. Finally, the community contributed money and rented a hall to serve as a temple where meetings were conducted. The Quran was soon introduced as the most authoritative of all texts for the study of the faith. Fard prepared texts that served as authoritative manuals of the faith and were memorized verbatim by his followers.

Beynon described disputes and tension that arose between the new community and the police over the group's refusal to send their children to public schools. One member of the group, later declared mentally insane, allegedly participated in "human sacrifice" in 1932 in an effort to follow lessons regarding the sacrifice of devils. These incidents drew police attention, according to Beynon, and contributed to persecutions and schisms.

Fard named his community the "Nation of Islam". Following the rapid increase in membership, he instituted a formal organizational structure. He established the University of Islam, where school-age children were taught, rather than in the public schools. He established the Moslem Girls' Training and General Civilization Class, where women were taught how to keep their houses, clean and cook. The men of the organization were drilled by captains and referred to as the Fruit of Islam. The entire movement was placed under a Minister of Islam.

According to Beynon, Fard's followers grew to approximately eight thousand. "Within three years the prophet not only began the movement but organized it so well that he himself was able to recede into the background, appearing almost never to his followers during the final months of his residence in Detroit."

From interviews with approximately 200 families who followed Fard, Beynon concluded:"Although the prophet lived in Detroit from July 4, 1930 until June 30, 1934, virtually nothing is known about him, save that he 'came from the East' and that he 'called' the Negroes of North America to enter the Nation of Islam. His very name is uncertain. He was known usually as Mr. Wali Farrad or Mr. W. D. Fard, though he used also the following names: Professor Ford, Mr. Farrad Mohammed, Mr. F. Mohammed Ali. One of the few survivors who heard his first addresses states that he himself said: 'My name is W. D. Fard and I came from the Holy City of Mecca. More about myself I will not tell you yet, for the time has not yet come. I am your brother. You have not yet seen me in my royal robes.' Legends soon sprang up about this mysterious personality."

Fard used the name "W. F. Muhammad" on several lessons written in 1933 and 1934. In 1933, he began signing his name "W. F. Muhammad", which stands for "Wallace Fard Muhammad".

Arrest 
On November 20, 1932, James J. Smith, a black man, was killed by Robert Harris, who was his roommate and a member of the Nation of Islam, on a makeshift altar in what was described as a human sacrifice. Harris attended meetings of the Detroit chapter of the Nation of Islam, then also called the Order of Islam, and Allah Temple of Islam, where he was given the name of Robert Karriem. He claimed he was influenced by the group. Consequently, Fard and another leader, Ugan Ali, were arrested and questioned. "The society cannot be blamed for anything he did," Ali was quoted in the Detroit News, November 23, 1932. "Harris had no standing in the order and was not regarded as a leader. Many people avoided him because of the wild things he sometimes said." Harris was later declared mentally unbalanced, pleaded guilty and was imprisoned, while Fard and Ali were released.

Efforts to trace Fard's history 1914–1926
Efforts to trace the origins and life story of Fard have been extensive but have yielded only fragmentary results and not even his date of death is known; further complicating any efforts is the fact that only 5 pictures of Fard are known to exist, 4 being mugshots taken after various arrests and one being the official portrait by the Nation of Islam; most observers agreed they all belong to the same person which was confirmed via facial recognition analysis. Additionally, Fard is alleged to have used up to 58 different aliases during his life.

Karl Evanzz of The Washington Post submitted a Freedom of Information Act request to the FBI in 1978 requesting its file on Fard. Evanzz based his account of Fard's life on the declassified portion of the FBI file that he received about a decade after his request. Evanzz detailed the experience of several other authors who also based their accounts of Fard's life on the FBI file.

From the FBI's response to the Freedom of Information Act request, Evanzz claimed that Fard, using the name Fred Dodd, married Pearl Allen in Multnomah County, Oregon, on May 9, 1914, with their first child, a son, born the next year.

Dodd left his family in 1916 and moved to Los Angeles, using the name Wallie Dodd Ford. A World War I draft registration card for Wallie Dodd Fard from 1917 indicated he was living in Los Angeles, unmarried, as a restaurant owner, and reported that he was born in Shinka, Afghanistan on February 26, 1893. He further reported that he was a resident alien and citizen of Afghanistan. He was described as of medium height and build with brown eyes and black hair. On the draft card, "Ford" is written in parentheses in a different hand. At the bottom of the card, he signed his name as "Wallie Dodd Ford".

As of 1920, Ford was still living in Los Angeles as 26-year-old Wallie D. Ford, with his 25-year-old wife, Hazel E. Ford. In the 1920 United States Census, his race was reported as white, his occupation as a proprietor of a restaurant, and his place of birth as New Zealand. He provided no known place of birth for his parents nor his date of immigration.

A marriage certificate dated June 5, 1924, was issued to Wallie Dodd Ford and Carmen Trevino (or Treviño) in Santa Ana, California. Ford reported that he was a cook, age 26, born in Oregon and living in Los Angeles. Trevino was a 22-year-old native of Mexico also living in Los Angeles. Both provided their race as "Spanish"; Ford claimed that his parents, "Zaradodd" and "Babbjie", were natives of Madrid, Spain.

A declassified Federal Bureau of Investigation (FBI) memorandum dated May 16, 1957, states: "From a review of instant file it does not appear that there has been a concerted effort to locate and fully identify W. D. Fard. In as much as Elijah Muhammad recognizes W.D. Fard as being Allah (God) and claims that Fard is the source of all of his teachings, it is suggested that an exhaustive effort be made to fully identify and locate W. D. Fard and/or members of his family." The FBI took note of the article written by Erdmann Doane Beynon, and it conducted a search for Fard using various aliases including the name "Ford".

The search produced two Fords of interest, one of whom was Wallace Ford, a prominent movie actor. The other was Wallie D. Ford of California, arrested by Los Angeles police on November 17, 1918, on a charge of assault with a deadly weapon.

On October 17, 1957, the FBI located and interviewed Hazel Barton-Ford, Wallie Ford's common-law wife, with whom he had a son named Wallace Dodd Ford, born on September 1, 1920. Barton-Ford gave a description of Wallie Ford, and described him as a Caucasian New Zealander. The FBI's search for Fard was officially closed the following year on April 15, 1958. Immigration records did not match any of his aliases. His true identity remains unknown, but there is strong evidence that the Nation of Islam founder Wallace D. Fard was the same man as Wallace Dodd Ford, an inmate in San Quentin Prison. According to Patrick D. Bowen, a PhD candidate at the University of Denver's Iliff School of Theology, fingerprints and photographs taken from San Quentin Prison matched those of Fard taken during the 1930s in Detroit; furthermore, in San Quentin he almost certainly came in contact with African American Muslim preachers and converts also incarcerated there.

Fard was arrested again on January 20, 1926, for violation of the California Woolwine Possession Act, and on February 15, 1926, for violation of the State Poison Act, for which he was sentenced to six months to six years at San Quentin State Prison on June 12, 1926. According to San Quentin records, Wallie D. Ford was born in Portland, Oregon, on February 25, 1891, the white son of Zared and Beatrice Ford, who were both born in Hawaii.

On August 15, 1959, the FBI sent a story to the Chicago New Crusader newspaper, stating that Fard was a "Turkish-born Nazi agent who worked for Hitler in World War II". According to the FBI story, Fard was a "Muslim from Turkey who had come to the United States in the early 1900s. He had met Muhammad in prison … where the two men plotted a confidence game in which followers were charged a fee to become Muslims." After the story was published, Elijah Muhammad and Malcolm X subsequently charged black media outlets, which reprinted the accusation in large numbers, with running the story without requesting a response from the Nation of Islam.

A February 19, 1963, FBI memorandum states: "In connection with efforts to disrupt and curb growth of the NOI, extensive research has been conducted into various files maintained by this office. Among the files reviewed was that of Wallace Dodd Ford." Five months later, in July 1963, the FBI told the Los Angeles Evening Herald-Examiner that Fard was actually Wallace Dodd Ford. The paper published the story in an article titled "Black Muslim Founder Exposed As White." An FBI memorandum dated August 1963 states that the FBI had not been able to verify his birthdate or birthplace, and "he was last heard from in 1934."

The Nation of Islam refutes the claim that Fard and Ford are one and the same in an article posted on the NOI website by Dr. Wesley Muhammad.

Karl Evanzz, in his book The Messenger, postulates that Fard was the son of a Pakistani Muslim, then known as East Indians. He bases this theory on several indications:

 Fard spent time at the Ahmadiyya Mosque, a movement prominent in Pakistan and used translations of the  Quran from Pakistanis. 
 The name Fard is a common surname in Pakistan as are other names he bestowed upon his followers such as Shabazz, Ghulam, and Kallatt
 Interviews with long-time Nation figures who met him or saw original photos of him such as Ozier Muhammad, Rodnell Collins (nephew of Malcolm X) and Wilfred Little indicate that Fard has Pakistani features
 Early teachings from Fard indicated a distrust and disdain for Hinduism

The 2019 book Finding W.D. Fard: Unveiling the Identity of the Founder of the Nation of Islam by Dr. John Andrew Morrow investigates theories of Fard's origin. "The people who actually met him, and the scholars who have studied him, have suggested that he was variously an African American, an Arab from Syria, Lebanon, Algeria, Morocco or Saudi Arabia... a Turk, an Afghan, an Indo-Pakistani... a Greek..."  Morrow  writes. "In an attempt to determine the origins of W.D. Fard, most scholars have relied on his teachings as passed down, and perhaps modified, by Elijah Muhammad. Some have suggested that he was a member of the Moorish Science Temple of America or the Ahmadiyyah Movement. Others have suggested that he was a Druze or a Shiite."

Chameleon: The True Story of W.D. Fard by A. K. Arian studies the origin of the Nation of Islam founder. One theory postulated is that Fard was of Afghan heritage.

Moorish Science Temple of America
In addition to his assertion that Fard was Ford, Evanzz also said that Fard was once a member of the Moorish Science Temple of America, citing as a primary source the 1945 publication by Arna Bontemps and Jack Conroy titled They Seek A City. Authors have also cited E. U. Essien-Udom for this proposition as well. In his 1962 book Black Nationalism: The Search for an Identity, Essien-Udom wrote:

"Noble Drew Ali was shot and stabbed in his offices at the Unity Club in Chicago on the night of March 15, 1929 … He was eventually released on bond, but a few weeks later, he died under mysterious circumstances. Some people claim that he died from injuries inflicted by the police while he was in jail. Others, however, suggest that he was killed by [Sheik Claude] Greene's partisans. For some time, one W. D. Fard assumed leadership of the Moorish movement. According to Bontemps and Conroy, Fard claimed that he was the reincarnation of Noble Drew Ali. By 1930 a permanent split developed in the movement. One faction, the Moors, remains faithful to Noble Drew Ali, and the other, which is now led by Elijah Muhammad, remains faithful to Prophet Fard (Master Wallace Fard Muhammad). However, Minister Malcolm X and other leaders of the Nation of Islam have emphatically denied any past connection whatsoever of Elijah Muhammad, Master Wallace Fard Muhammad, or their movement with Nobel Drew Ali's Moorish American Science Temple."

On the question of a connection between the Nation of Islam and the Moorish Science Temple of America, Beynon wrote:
"Awakened already to a consciousness of race discrimination, these migrants from the South came into contact with militant movements among northern Negroes. Practically none of them had been in the North prior to the collapse of the Marcus Garvey movement. A few of them had come under the influence of the Moorish-American cult which succeeded it. The effect of both these movements upon the future members of the Nation of Islam was largely indirect. Garvey taught the Negroes that their homeland was Ethiopia. The Noble Drew Ali, the prophet of the Moorish-Americans, proclaimed that these people were 'descendants of Morrocans [Moroccans]'."

Beynon also wrote: "The prophet’s message was characterized by his ability to utilize to the fullest measure the environment of his followers. Their physical and economic difficulties alike were used to illustrate the new teaching. Similarly, biblical prophecies and the teachings of Marcus Garvey and Noble Drew Ali were cited as foretelling the coming of the new prophet".

Relationship with Elijah Muhammad
With regard to Elijah Muhammad, Beynon's article stated: "From among the larger group of Muslims there has sprung recently an even more militant branch than the Nation of Islam itself. This new movement, known as the Temple People, identifies the prophet, Mr. W. D. Fard, with the God, Allah. To Mr. Fard alone do they offer prayer and sacrifice. Since Mr. Fard has been deified, the Temple People raise to the rank of prophet the former Minister of Islam, Elijah Mohammed, now a resident of Chicago. He is always referred to reverently as the 'Prophet Elijah in Chicago.

Elijah Muhammad, who led the Nation of Islam from 1934 to 1975, heard Fard teach for the first time in 1931. Elijah Muhammad stated that he and Fard became inseparable between 1931 and 1934, where he felt "jailed almost" due to the amount of time that they spent together with Fard teaching him day and night.

A handwritten lesson written by Fard states:"Twelve Leaders of Islam from all over the Planet have conferred in the Root of Civilization concerning the Lost-Found Nation of Islam – must return to their original Land. One of the Conference Members by the name of Mr. Osman Sharrieff said to the Eleven Members of the Conference: 'The Lost-Found Nation of Islam will not return to their original Land unless they, first, have a thorough Knowledge of their own.' So they sent a Messenger to them of their own. Now, the Messenger and his Laborers worked day and night for the last three and one-half years, and their accomplishments are approximately twenty-five thousand..."

In this lesson, Fard places the number of converts obtained in Detroit at 25,000, and he describes a "Messenger" sent to the "Lost-Found Nation of Islam" who is "of their own". Nation of Islam theology states that this "Messenger" is Elijah Muhammad.

Fard wrote, in his instructions to the leaders of his community, that they should "copy the Answers of Lesson of Minister Elijah Muhammad." He went on to state: "Why is Stress made to the Muslims to Copy, the Minister, Elijah Muhammad's Answers? The past History shows that the ALMIGHTY ALLAH sends Prophets and Apostles for the people's Guide and Example, and through them HIS Mystery was Revealed. And those who follow the Apostle would see the Light."

Fard wrote several lessons which are read and committed to memory by members of the Nation of Islam. Some of the lessons are in the form of questions asked by Fard to Elijah Muhammad. One such lesson concludes with the text: "This Lesson No. 2 was given by our Prophet, W.D. Fard, which contains 40 questions answered by Elijah Muhammad, one of the lost found in the wilderness of North America February 20th, 1934."

Ideology
Beynon described the substance of Fard's teaching as follows:"The black men in North America are not Negroes, but members of the lost tribe of Shabazz, stolen by traders from the Holy City of Mecca 379 years ago. The prophet came to America to find and to bring back to life his long lost brethren, from whom the Caucasians had taken away their language, their nation and their religion. Here in America they were living other than themselves. They must learn that they are the original people, noblest of the nations of the earth. The Caucasians are the colored people, since they have lost their original color. The original people must regain their religion, which is Islam, their language, which is Arabic, and their culture, which is astronomy and higher mathematics, especially calculus. They must live according to the law of Allah, avoiding all meat of 'poison animals', hogs, ducks, geese, possums and catfish. They must give up completely the use of stimulants, especially liquor. They must clean themselves up – both their bodies and their houses. If in this way they obeyed Allah, he would take them back to the Paradise from which they had been stolen – the Holy City of Mecca."

Fard's lessons actually state that the "traders" referenced by Beynon, came to Africa, not Mecca.

Modern Nation of Islam theology is based upon the belief that Fard's teaching of Elijah Muhammad was fulfillment of scripture regarding God's teaching of an Apostle, where Fard is described as "God in Person", the "Messiah", and the "Mahdi". Fard wrote the following for his followers:"[T]he LESSONS that OUR SAVIOUR (ALLAH) gave us to Study and Learn is the Fulfillment of the Prophecies of All the Former Prophets concerning the Beginning of the Devils, and the Ending of the Civilization, and of our Enslavement by the Devils, and Present Time of our Delivery from the Devils by OUR SAVIOUR (ALLAH). PRAISE HIS HOLY NAME! There is No God but ALLAH. How that ALLAH would separate us from the Devils and, then destroy them; and Change us into a New and Perfect People; and Fill the Earth with FREEDOM, JUSTICE and EQUALITY as it was filled with wickedness; and Making we, the Poor Lost-Founds, the Perfect RULERS."

In his 1965 book Message to the Blackman in America, which is a compilation of articles written by Elijah Muhammad for newspapers throughout the early part of his Ministry, he summarized what Fard taught him as follows:"He began teaching us the knowledge of ourselves, of God and the devil, of the measurement of the earth, of other planets, and of the civilization of some of the planets other than earth. ... He measured and weighed the earth and its water; the history of the moon; the history of the two nations, black and white, that dominate the earth. He gave the exact birth of the white race; the name of their God who made them and how; and the end of their time, the judgment, how it will begin and end. ... He taught us the truth of how we were made 'slaves' and how we are kept in slavery by the 'slave-masters children. He declared the doom of America, for her evils to us was past due. And that she is number one to be destroyed. Her judgment could not take place until we hear the truth. ...

He declared that we were without the knowledge of self or anyone else. How we had been made blind, deaf and dumb by this white race of people and how we must return to our people, our God and His religion of peace (Islam), the religion of the prophets. We must give up the slave names of our slave-masters and accept the name of Allah (God) or one of His divine attributes. He also taught us to give up all evil doings and practices and do righteousness or be destroyed from the face of the earth. He taught us that the slave-masters had taught us to eat the wrong food and that this is the cause of our sickness and short span of life. He declared that he would heal us and set us in heaven at once, if we would submit to Him. Otherwise he would chastise us with a severe chastisement until we did submit. And that He was able to force the whole world into submission to his will. He said that he loved us (the so-called Negroes), his lost and found, so well that he would eat rattlesnakes to free us if necessary, for he has power over all things." Wallace Fard Muhammad loved the black people of the United States of America. Part of Fard's teaching also involved admiration for Japan. He was linked to the Pacific Movement of the Eastern World and Japanese agitators such as Satokata Takahashi, and Ashima Takis. The FBI charged that Takahashi had been an influential presence in the Nation of Islam. He spoke as a guest at the NOI temples in Detroit and Chicago.

In popular culture
 
Fard appears in the novel Middlesex, by Jeffrey Eugenides, in which Fard's Detroit Temple No. 1 is the location setting for several scenes in the book.

Fard and his teachings are also referenced in many hip-hop songs. Artists who have made references within their music include Jay-Z ("I'm going to chase the Yacub back in the cave"), Jay Electronica ("Lost tribe of Shabazz stylin' on the record", "The son of W.D., who hung around in the D, Who ran around in the three, The trap gods raised me, Face all on the Sphinx, Story all in the wall of the pyramids, Niggas know the Black God saved me"), Brand Nubian ("This Asiatic black man is a dog spelled backwards, The maker, the owner, the cream of the planet earth, Father of civilization, God of the universe, Manifestin thought with my infinite styles, Making sure this travels twenty-three million miles, The other six I set the crucifix, Because the heart of the problem is this...."), and Ras Kass in the song "Riiiot" ("Now I got niggas claiming they saw God unfortunately, he wasn't in the person of Master Fard Muhammad").

See also
 God complex
 List of people who disappeared
 List of people who have been considered deities

References

Notes

Citations

Sources

External links
FBI file on Wallace Fard
Historical Analysis of FBI's COINTELPRO AND W. Fard Muhammad

1870s births
19th-century births
19th-century apocalypticists
20th-century apocalypticists
1930s missing person cases
Cult leaders
Deified people
Founders of new religious movements
Members of the Moorish Science Temple of America
Missing person cases in Michigan
Nation of Islam religious leaders
New religious movement deities
People convicted of drug offenses
Place of birth unknown
Place of death unknown
Religious leaders from California
Religious leaders from Michigan
Self-declared mahdi
Year of death unknown